John Litz (born July 24, 1961) is a United States Democratic Party politician, formerly serving as a State Representative in Tennessee.   He represented District 10, Hamblen County.

Biography
John Litz hold a B.S. degree in Agriculture from the University of Tennessee and makes his living as a farmer, operating Litz Farms in Hamblen County. He was first elected to the General Assembly in 2002 defeating Republican incumbent Stancil Ford. He  served as a House member of the 103rd, 104th and 105th General Assemblies serving on the following committees:
 Secretary, House Calendar and Rules Committee
 Member, House Agriculture Committee
 Member, House State and Local Committee
 Vice Chair, House Elections Subcommittee

In November 2006, Litz was re-elected without opposition to a 3rd term.  In December 2006, he was selected by the Democratic Caucus to serve as Assistant Majority Leader. In September 2007, Litz announced his intention to retire from the legislature after his current term expired.

References

1961 births
Living people
21st-century American politicians
People from Morristown, Tennessee
University of Tennessee alumni
Democratic Party members of the Tennessee House of Representatives